Mir Bozhiy (God's World, Мир божий) was a Russian monthly magazine published in Saint Petersburg in 1892–1906. It was edited first by Viktor Ostrogorsky (1892-1901), then by Fyodor Batyushkov (1902-1906). In July 1906 Mir Bozhiy was closed by censors. The publisher of the magazine was Alexandra Davydova, mother-in-law of Alexander Kuprin.

History
The publication's original intention was to promote self-education by popularizing science and history. By mid-1890, due largely to Angel Bogdanovich (who instigated on the journal's pages a well-publicized polemic with narodniks), it became more politically aware. Attracting Marxist (mainly the so-called Legal Marxists: Pyotr Struve, Mikhail Tugan-Baranovsky, Nikolai Berdyaev and others) authors and readership, it became popular among liberal and radical Russian intelligentsia.

The literary criticism section was edited by Bogdanovich, Vladimir Kranikhfeld and Nevedomsky. Among the magazine's regular contributors were Vikenty Veresaev, Leonid Andreev, Ivan Bunin, Alexander Kuprin, Mikhail Artsybashev, Dmitry Mamin-Sibiryak, Ignaty Potapenko, Nikolai Garin-Mikhailovsky (fiction); Ivan Ivanov, Pavel Milyukov, Yevgeny Tarle, Fyodor Batyushkov, Evgeny Anichkov, Nestor Kotlyarevsky (non-fiction).

In July 1906 the journal was closed by censors. It changed its title and in October 1906 re-emerged as Sovremenny Mir (Modern World) with Bogdanovich at the helm.

References

1892 establishments in the Russian Empire
1906 disestablishments in the Russian Empire
Aleksandr Kuprin
Defunct literary magazines published in Europe
Defunct magazines published in Russia
Magazines established in 1892
Magazines disestablished in 1906
Magazines published in Saint Petersburg
Russian-language magazines
Literary magazines published in Russia
Monthly magazines published in Russia